Daniel Kinyua Wanjiru (born 26 May 1992) is a Kenyan long-distance runner. He won both the 2016 Amsterdam Marathon and the 2017 London Marathon. His personal best time for the marathon is 2:05:21, set in Amsterdam in 2016.

Early life 
Wanjiru was born on 26 May 1992 in Embu County, Kenya to Sally Wanjiru. He received his education at Mutitu High School and graduated in 2008. He started running while at school.  Daniel Wanjiru is not related to the late marathoner Samuel Wanjiru.

Wanjiru is a resident of Kirinyaga County, Kirinyaga Central Constituency, Kanyeki-ini ward.

Career 
Wanjiru started his career in the non-profit team Run2gether (founded by former Austrian orienteering champion Thomas Krejci) winning several road races mainly in Austria and Italy.

In 2016 Wanjiru won the Amsterdam Marathon in a course-record time. He was twice winner of the Prague Half Marathon (2015 and 2016).

In April 2020, Wanjiru was provisionally suspended from all competitions by the Athletics Integrity Unit for a doping violation.

Achievements

References

External links
 
 2017 Virgin Money London Marathon Result

1992 births
Living people
Kenyan male marathon runners
Kenyan male long-distance runners
People from Embu County